H. S. Sekhon (born 11 November 1950) is a former Indian cricket umpire. He stood in two ODI games between 1994 and 1996.

See also
List of One Day International cricket umpires

References

1950 births
Living people
Indian One Day International cricket umpires
Place of birth missing (living people)